Marion Osborn Cunningham (1908 - 1948) was an American artist.

Biography
Cunningham née Osborn was born on May 29, 1908 in South Bend, Indiana.
Marion’s first formal art instruction was received at Bakersfield High School (then Kern County Union High School) under the tutelage of Mrs. Ruth Emerson. From there, Marion attended Santa Barbara College. She received an AB degree from Stanford University. Marion continued her studies at the California School of Fine Arts (now the San Francisco Art Institute). Marion studied at The Art Students League of New York. She married fellow artist Ben Cunningham. The couple eventually divorced.

Cunningham began creating serigraphs in the 1930s. A recurring subject were cable car scenes. She was a member of the National Serigraph Society, the San Francisco Art Association, and the San Francisco Women Artists.

She died in 1948. The Bakersfield Museum of Art's former name, Cunningham Memorial Art Gallery, had been in her namesake and was founded by her family after her death.

Cunningham's work is in the collection of the National Gallery of Art and the Bakersfield Museum of Art. Her work is also in the collections of the Cleveland Museum of Art, the de Young Museum, the Metropolitan Museum of Art, the Museum of Modern Art, the Saint Louis Art Museum and the San Francisco Museum of Modern Art.

Exhibitions 
Cunningham exhibited her work from 1935 until her death, and posthumously in a memorial exhibit at San Francisco Museum of Art.

References

1908 births
1948 deaths
Artists from California
People from South Bend, Indiana